The Diocese of Yangon (formerly Rangoon) is the Church of the Province of Myanmar (Anglican) jurisdiction in and around the old capital Yangon, and under the care of the Bishop of Yangon and Archbishop of Myanmar. The diocese (then called Rangoon) was in the Church of England province of Calcutta from 1877 to 1930, then the Church of India, Pakistan, Burma and Ceylon until 1970. Beforehand, British Burma, had come under the guidance of the Bishop of Calcutta, Metropolitan of India. In 1966, the last non-Burmese bishop was evicted by the Burmese authorities and in 1970 the Diocese of Rangoon became the Church of the Province of Burma, and the bishop was elevated to Archbishop in that church.

Title
He was officially styled The Right Reverend Father in God, (Name), by Divine Providence Lord Bishop of Rangoon, but this full title was rarely used, the majority of the time the bishop being addressed either Bishop or Lord Bishop of Rangoon. In signing his name, the bishop's surname would be replaced by the name of his diocese. Therefore, J.O.E. Bloggs would become J.O.E. Rangoon in official correspondence.

Pay and residence
In 1884 the pay of the Bishop was the not insubstantial salary of £960 per annum. The official residence of the Bishop was throughout the existence of the diocese Bishop's Court in Rangoon.

History
The area today known as Myanmar was in 1877 part of the British Indian Empire, and known as Burma. It was decided that the area of Southern Burma required a more substantial ecclesiastical presence than the Bishop of Calcutta could provide. For decades the American baptist, Society for the Propagation of the Gospel (SPG) and Society for Promoting Christian Knowledge (SPCK) missionaries had been making inroads among the Burmese and Karenni peoples. In recognition of this, the Diocese of Winchester created an Endowment Fund for the establishment of a bishopric in Burma; the diocese itself contributed £10,000. The SPG, SPCK. and the Colonial Bishoprics' Fund together contributed £10,000 to the creation of the diocese. Therefore in 1877 the diocese of Rangoon, subject to the diocese of Calcutta was established by Letters Patent. Jonathan Holt Titcomb, a parish priest in Winchester diocese, was elected the first Bishop of Rangoon and so appointed on 17 December 1877.

At first the diocese encompassed only the southern half of Burma, but was later extended to cover the whole of the country. The Bishop was formerly appointed by the monarch on the advice of the Secretary of State for India. However, in 1927 in response to growing agitation on the part of the bishops in India the British Parliament passed legislation to bring to an end the Church of England's jurisdiction over the church in India. Consequently, the Diocese of Rangoon became a major part of the new, autonomous Church of India, Burma and Ceylon. Covering the entirety of Burma, the diocese was in effect the Church of Burma. In Burma, the Bishop was permitted to title himself as head of the Church of Burma.

The Bishop continued to assume his duties in Burma after the independence of that country in 1948. There were eight Bishops of Rangoon before the Church of Burma became autocephalous. However, in 1966 the Burmese government forced all Western missionaries to leave, including the then-bishop V.G. Shearburn. His assistant bishop, Francis Ah Mya was appointed Bishop in his place. In 1970, the Church of Burma, hitherto part of the Church of India, Pakistan, Burma and Ceylon (the then-current incarnation of the 1927 creation) became the Anglican Church of the Province of Burma (later of Myanmar), and the See of Rangoon was permanently attached to (and held ex officio with) the elected Primatial and Metropolitan archepiscopal See.

Bishops
Bishops of Rangoon
1877–1882: Jonathan Titcomb
1882–1903: John Strachan
1903–1909: Arthur Knight
1910–1928: Rolleston Fyffe
1928–1934: Norman Tubbs
1935–1954: George West
1941 (appointed): A. T. (Alfred Thomas) "Tim" Houghton, assistant bishop-designate
1955–1966: Victor Shearburn
1949–1966: Francis Ah Mya, assistant bishop
1949–1973: John Aung Hla, assistant bishop
28 August 19661970: Francis Ah Mya
Bishops of Rangoon and Archbishops of Burma
1970–1973: Francis Ah Mya
1973–1979: John Aung Hla
6 October 19791987: Gregory Hla Kyaw
1988–1989: Andrew Mya Han
1988–1993: Samuel San Si Htay, assistant bishop
Bishops of Yangon and Archbishops of Myanmar
1989–2001: Andrew Mya Han
1993after 2007: Joseph Than Pe, assistant bishop
2001–2008: Samuel San Si Htay
2008–present: Stephen Than Myint Oo

Notes

References

External links
 

 
Yangon
Rangoon
Rangoon
1877 establishments in Burma
Religious organizations established in 1877
Church of India, Burma and Ceylon
Yangon-related lists